The Fear Is What Keeps Us Here is the eighth full-length album by metalcore band Zao. It was released on June 13, 2006 on Ferret Records in the US and on June 12, 2006 in Europe. The album showcases the addition of drummer Jeff Gretz and bassist Martin Lunn. In interviews Gretz jokingly claimed it would be titled "The George Lucas Neckfat".

Album note
The album was released in two versions. The limited edition deluxe edition contains expanded artwork and a bonus "making the album" DVD. Both versions contain the same music. Some pre-ordered copies of the album came with a separate sheet of paper with easier-to-read lyrics for each song.

Concept
There is no strict concept to the album, as on The Funeral of God. The album deals with more obscure/varied subject matter. Topics throughout the album include death and loss of everything you have ("Everything You Love Will Soon Fly Away"), politics ("American Sheets on the Deathbed", "Kingdom of Thieves"), frustration with false interpretations of the band's purpose ("It's Hard Not to Shake with a Gun in Your Mouth"), that we can't do it all alone ("Physician Heal Thyself"), American priorities ("Pudgy Young Blondes with Lobotomy Eyes") and zombies ("My Love, My Love (We've Come Back From the Dead)"). The band says the underlying theme is "loss of control."

Sound
It's been called the most abrasive Zao record to date. Steve Albini's live to analog-tape production (with no computer "fixing") and the band's decision to track all of the drums, bass and guitar live lends an accurate representation of the band's live sound. Dan Weyandt's vocals are given the same treatment as he sang with a hand-held microphone through an amplifier to simulate an over-driven P.A. at a small club show. Instead of adding the melodic elements that were introduced on the album The Funeral of God, it takes a somewhat raw, black metal-influenced sound.

Track listing

Credits
Zao
Dan Weyandt – lead vocals
Scott Mellinger – guitar, clean vocals
Martin Lunn – bass, backing vocals
Jeff Gretz – drums

Additional 
Steve Albini – recording engineer
John Golden – mastering
Jeff Gros – photography
Carl Severson – A&R

References

2006 albums
Zao (American band) albums
Ferret Music albums
Albums produced by Steve Albini